In differential geometry, the cotangent space is a vector space associated with a point  on a smooth (or differentiable) manifold ; one can define a cotangent space for every point on a smooth manifold. The elements of the cotangent space are called cotangent vectors or tangent covectors.

Properties
All cotangent spaces at points on a connected manifold have the same dimension, equal to the dimension of the manifold. All the cotangent spaces of a manifold can be "glued together" (i.e. unioned and endowed with a topology) to form a new differentiable manifold of twice the dimension, the cotangent bundle of the manifold.

The tangent space and the cotangent space at a point are both real vector spaces of the same dimension and therefore isomorphic to each other via many possible isomorphisms. The introduction of a Riemannian metric or a symplectic form gives rise to a natural isomorphism between the tangent space and the cotangent space at a point, associating to any tangent covector a canonical tangent vector.

Formal definitions

Definition as linear functionals

Then the cotangent space at x is defined as the dual space of 

That is, every element  is a linear map

where  is the underlying field of the vector space being considered, for example, the field of real numbers.

Alternative definition

In some cases, one might like to have a direct definition of the cotangent space without reference to the tangent space. The cotangent space will then consist of all the possible first-order behaviors of a function near .

This formulation is analogous to the construction of the cotangent space to define the Zariski tangent space in algebraic geometry. The construction also generalizes to locally ringed spaces.

The differential of a function

Let  be a smooth manifold and let  be a smooth function.

Equivalently, we can think of tangent vectors as tangents to curves, and write

Properties of the differential map include:

 

The differential map provides the link between the two alternate definitions of the cotangent space given above. Given a function  (a smooth function vanishing at ) we can form the linear functional  as above. One can show that this map is an isomorphism, establishing the equivalence of the two definitions.

The pullback of a smooth map

Just as every differentiable map  between manifolds induces a linear map (called the pushforward or derivative) between the tangent spaces

every such map induces a linear map (called the pullback) between the cotangent spaces, only this time in the reverse direction:

The pullback is naturally defined as the dual (or transpose) of the pushforward. Unraveling the definition, this means the following:

Note carefully where everything lives.

If we define tangent covectors in terms of equivalence classes of smooth maps vanishing at a point then the definition of the pullback is even more straightforward.

Exterior powers

The -th exterior power of the cotangent space, denoted , is another important object in differential geometry. Vectors in the -th exterior power, or more precisely sections of the -th exterior power of the cotangent bundle, are called differential -forms. They can be thought of as alternating, multilinear maps on  tangent vectors. 
For this reason, tangent covectors are frequently called one-forms.

References 

 
 
 
 

Differential topology
Tensors